Jamroom is a community focused open source software web content management system (CMS) and Framework based on PHP and MySQL, which runs on a web hosting service. Features include a module based extension system and skins using the Smarty templating engine. Jamroom is distributed under the open source Mozilla Public License (MPL)

Features 

Jamroom has a web template system using a template processor.

Skins 
Jamroom users may install and switch between skins. Skins allow users to change the look and functionality of a Jamroom website.  Skins may be installed using the Jamroom "Marketplace" administration tool or skin folders may be uploaded via FTP.  The PHP, HTML & CSS code found in themes can be added or edited for providing advanced features. Many Jamroom skins exist, some free, and some premium (paid for) templates.

Modules 
One very popular feature of Jamroom is its module architecture which allows users and developers to extend its abilities beyond the core installation. From Jamroom 5 the structure of the system changed majorly from the previous version. The largest change being that even the core of Jamroom itself became a module. By adding additional modules, more features can be made available to users on their profiles.

RESTful API 
Jamroom can be used to support creating web services according to the Representational State Transfer (REST) architectural pattern via an installable package called 'proxima'.

Profile Centric 
A primary part of the design structure of Jamroom is the concept that profiles are the prime locations for content uploaded and imported into the site by the users.  This derives from Jamroom's origins as a musician content management system for building communities where bands could showcase their talent.  As of Jamroom 5, the focus of 'just for music' has been removed, but the profile centric nature has remained.

Mobiles 
Up until Jamroom 4 the primary means of delivering video and audio content to visitors to the site was via flash. From Jamroom 5 the issue of some mobile devices not supporting flash made it important to change delivery methods in Jamroom too.  Currently audio and video media that is uploaded to a Jamroom 5 installation is converted into various formats so that media can have the widest possible set of delivery scenarios.

Core 
In the Jamroom community, the term "core" has 2 uses. The first is the initial set of modules and skins that are downloaded and used to install a Jamroom community site.  The second refers to the jrCore module itself.  Everything in Jamroom is either a Module or a Skin.

Core Modules 
Jamroom core download package includes the following modules that can be enabled by the administrator to extend the functionality of the core website.

Core Skins 
Jamroom core download package includes the following skins.

History

Releases

See also 

 Comparison of web frameworks
 Comparison of social networking software
 List of content management systems

References

External links 
 Official Website
 YouTube Channel

2003 software
Content management systems
Free content management systems
Free software programmed in PHP
Website management
PHP frameworks
Web frameworks